State Highway 165 (SH 165) is a  state highway in southern Colorado. SH 165's western terminus is at SH 96 east of Silver Cliff, and the eastern terminus is at Interstate 25 (I-25), U.S. Route 85 (US 85) and US 87 near Colorado City.

Route description
SH 165 begins in the west at a junction with SH 96 roughly fifteen miles east of Silver Cliff. From there the road proceeds to the southeast through portions of San Isabel National Forest.

After Fairview, the highway meets the southwest end of SH 78 near San Isabel, through which SH 165 also passes. After San Isabel, the highway turns more nearly easterly and passes out of the national forest and though Rye. The route continues east through Colorado City before reaching its eastern terminus at exit 74 of I-25.

The highway forms part of the Frontier Pathways Scenic Byway.

Major intersections

References

External links

 Frontier Pathways Scenic Byway

165
Transportation in Pueblo County, Colorado
Pueblo, Colorado